Conklin Mountain House is a historic home located at Olean in Cattaraugus County, New York. The above ground portion of the main house is a 4,500 sq. ft Second Empire style wood frame dwelling built in 1886. The front facade features a three-story tower with mansard roof and a wraparound porch. The exterior of the home features extensive overhanging eaves, decorative brackets and balustrades.  The house sits on top of a 2,000 sq. ft full-height stone basement.  The property also includes a 1,600 sq. ft two-story carriage house.

The interior features elaborate and extensive woodwork, quarter-sawn oak floors throughout the house, one of the longest cantilevered staircases on the East Coast of the United States, a large and ornate antique Eastlake-style chandelier in the dining room, and the only known existing installation of M.H. Birge & Sons block-printed peacock wallpaper ca. 1915. The home was constructed by the owners of Conklin Wagon Works, one of Olean's most important industries in the late 19th century.  It was subsequently owned by the Mountain family, who operated the Mountain Clinic Infirmary, and is currently an owner-occupied single family residence not open to the public.

It was listed on the National Register of Historic Places in 1998.

History
The home was built in 1886 by William H. Conklin.  Mr. Conklin was born on December 21, 1811, in Greenfield, Saratoga County, New York.  In 1860 he moved his wagon-making business to Olean; the famous Conklin Wagon Works.  It became one of Olean's most important industries at that time, eventually growing to employ 50 skilled laborers with an output of 2000 wagons per year.  The wagon works was located closer to the Allegheny River than the house itself, which sits some 600 feet away.  This was for purposes of using the river systems for transportation of materials and completed wagons.

First Floor
The first floor of the home, used mainly for entertaining guests, features 12 foot ceilings throughout and contains the vestibule, foyer, first parlor or "music room", library, second parlor or "drawing room", a formal dining room and kitchen.

Vestibule and Foyer
The vestibule is a small space approximately 16 feet square.  It's the first space encountered upon entering the home and is separated from the foyer by a double-door.  The foyer contains access to the main staircase with a large carved newel post made from cherry and Birds-Eye Maple.  The staircase and landings are cantilevered above the first floor and feature a continuous varnished maple railing supported by 102 turned spindles.

Music Room
The first parlor, also known as the "blue room" or "Music room" features blue wallpaper inside of decorative wall moldings and is the scene of most seasonal celebrations.  During the Christmas season the largest tree is placed in the bay window of this room.  It houses the grand piano and Victrola, among other instruments.

Library
The library/lounge room contains a 10-foot L-shaped bar, brick fireplace and built-in bookshelves.

Drawing Room
The second parlor, also known as the "drawing room" or "ladies salon" features white wallpaper depicting gnarled trees and fanciful scenes. It contains a large white tile fireplace and mantle straddled by ornately carved wooden griffons.

References

Sources

Houses on the National Register of Historic Places in New York (state)
Second Empire architecture in New York (state)
Houses completed in 1886
Houses in Cattaraugus County, New York
National Register of Historic Places in Cattaraugus County, New York